André Godard (21 January 1881 – 31 July 1965) was an archaeologist, architect and historian of French and Middle Eastern Art. He served as the director of the Iranian Archeological Service for many years.

Life
Godard was born in Chaumont. A graduate of the École des Beaux-Arts of Paris, he studied Middle Eastern archaeology, particularly that of Iran, and later became known for designing the National Museum of Iran, where he was appointed inaugural director in 1936. He was also instrumental in the design of Tehran University campus.

He made his first trip to the Middle East in 1910 with Henri Violle. Together, they began to excavate the ancient ruins of Samarra, located in modern-day Iraq. The ruins were fully excavated a few years later by German-born archaeologist Ernst Herzfeld. Godard returned to his architectural studies in 1912, focusing on Islamic architecture of Egypt.

After World War I, Godard married Yeda Reuilly. The Delegation of French Archaeology in Afghanistan was subsequently founded in 1922, so Godard and his new wife accompanied the organization to not-yet-excavated regions. They consequently studied Bâmiyân, which was later permitted to be exhibited at the central Buddhist shrine of the Guimet Museum, in 1925.

In 1928, Godard was granted the directorship of Iranian Archeological Services, by the authority of Reza Shah. The IAS was intended to mark the end of French monopoly over excavation in Iran. As such, Godard focused on the politics of conservation, and held the title of Director from 1928 to 1953, then again from 1956 to 1960. Reza Shah also appointed him director of the National Museum of Iran (Muze-ye Irân-e Bāstān).

During his tenure, Godard was responsible for the restoration of major historic monuments of Iran, such as the Friday Mosque, the Shah Mosque, and Mosque of Sheikh Lutfallah of Isfahan among others. Using his directorships, he organized large excavations of bronzes of Luristan, Persepolis and Isfahan. He was also instrumental, together with fellow architect Maxime Siroux, in the design of the National Library of Iran, Tomb of Hafez, and Central Pardis, the main campus of the University of Tehran.

During World War II Godard opposed the Vichy government of France and when the Vichy diplomatic representatives were expelled from Tehran in 1942, helped form the Free France Committee and later become the official diplomatic representative of the provisional government in Tehran. In this period his wife Yedda organized an information radio program on Free France which was broadcast on the Persian radio.

Godard returned to Paris in 1960, where he continued to write on Iranian art. He died in Paris on 31 July 1965.

References

1881 births
1965 deaths
People from Haute-Marne
20th-century French architects
French archaeologists
French Iranologists
French curators
French expatriates in Iran
Architecture in Iran
École des Beaux-Arts alumni
20th-century archaeologists